The Phantom Cowboy is a 1935 American western film directed by Robert J. Horner and starring Ted Wells, George Chesebro and Jimmy Aubrey.

Cast 
Ted Wells as Bill Collins / Jim Russell (The Phantom Rider)
Doris Brook as Ruth Rogers
George Chesebro as Buck Houston
Jimmy Aubrey as Ptomaine Pete
Richard Cramer as Hank Morgan
Lew Meehan as Crooked Foreman Mason
Frank Clark as Sheriff
James Sheridan as Jack Rogers
Rosamond Wagman as Rancher's Daughter

External links 

1935 films
1935 Western (genre) films
American Western (genre) films
American black-and-white films
1930s English-language films
1930s American films